Pavel Hašek (born 27 June 1983) is a Czech football midfielder currently playing for Bohemians 1905 in the Czech Republic.

Early career
Before making his league debut, Hašek played for Bohemians 1905 in the Tipsport Cup winter tournament in January 2001. He was loaned to FC Velim in the spring of 2001 while a player at Bohemians.

Blšany
In 2002, Hašek signed for Chmel Blšany, where he played top flight football for two years. On 13 September 2003 Hašek scored for Blšany in the Czech First League match against FK Teplice, four minutes after coming on as a substitute. The game finished 2–2. In March 2004, Hašek was one of nine sick Blšany players, leading to the postponement of the Czech First League fixture against Viktoria Plzeň.

Between leagues
Hašek signed for Czech 2. Liga side Viktoria Plzeň in 2004. Hašek spent just one season with Plzeň, the 2004–05 Czech 2. Liga, during which Plzeň finished third and were promoted. He was released following the expiry of his contract in 2005.

Hašek joined Czech First League side Příbram in 2005, where he played for one season, making 13 appearances.

He played for Czech 2. Liga side Bohemians 1905 in the 2006–07 Czech 2. Liga, during which the club achieved promotion to the Czech First League. Following the end of the season, Hašek moved back to the Czech First League with FK Teplice in June 2007. Hašek made just one appearance for Teplice in the autumn of 2007 before moving back to Bohemians on loan in January 2008. In July 2008, Hašek moved on loan to Slovak side Artmedia Petržalka. Hašek ended his loan spell in Slovakia and returned to Teplice in January 2009.

Dukla Prague
Hašek joined Czech 2. Liga side FK Dukla Prague in September 2009. After two seasons in the second division, Dukla won promotion back to the Czech First League in 2011.

In 2012, Hašek scored his first top-flight goal for eight years in Dukla's 2–0 win against Bohemians 1905. He joined České Budějovice in September 2013 on loan for the rest of the season. After playing just nine matches for Budějovice, Hašek suffered a broken leg in a mid-season friendly match in February 2014, preventing him for playing any more that season.

Personal
Hašek comes from a sporting family. His father Ivan Hašek is a famous Czech footballer, who played for and later managed the national team, while his younger brother, also called Ivan Hašek, also played in the Czech First League.

Career statistics

Statistics accurate as of match played 1 September 2013

References

External links
 
 
 

1983 births
Living people
Czech footballers
Czech Republic youth international footballers
Czech First League players
Bohemians 1905 players
FK Chmel Blšany players
FC Viktoria Plzeň players
1. FK Příbram players
FK Teplice players
FK Dukla Prague players
Slovak Super Liga players
FC Petržalka players
Association football midfielders